David Thomas Sheppard (born 6 November 1981 in Reading, Berkshire), sometimes known as Shep is an English broadcaster.

As of 2022, he currently presents a nightly regional show for BBC South West, networked across BBC Radio Devon, Cornwall, Guernsey and Jersey.

He has presented regular shows on BBC Radio Berkshire, and Oxford and hosted a long running afternoon show on BBC Radio Devon. He has also worked at BBC Radio Solent and Bristol, mostly presenting regional programmes for the South and West.

From 2018 he became the male voice of Great Western Railway, heard on trains and stations throughout the network. Other voiceover credits include BBC1 and BBC2 television, BBC Radio 1, Kerrang!, Vue Cinemas and Brilliant TV.

He studied at University of Oxford and University of Bristol, beginning his radio career at the latter in 2001 while running Burst Radio, the student radio station.

Other Appearances 
Sheppard's addiction to coffee was documented in a BBC2 television documentary The Truth About Food, in which he and former Tomorrow's World presenter Maggie Philbin were tested for the effects of caffeine deprivation.

From the age of 16 he was also a daily contributor to BBC Radio 2's Wake Up to Wogan, under the guise of the Assistant to the BBC's (then) Director-General, Greg Dyke.

Sheppard owns several vintage vehicles including a coach which he has restored himself, and is a trustee and director of the Thames Valley & Great Western Omnibus Trust.

References

External links

BBC radio presenters
English radio DJs
Actors from Reading, Berkshire
Alumni of the University of Oxford
Television personalities from Berkshire
1981 births
Living people
Alumni of the University of Bristol
English male radio actors
21st-century English male actors